Meadowbrook Country Club is a country club in Northville Township, Wayne County, Michigan.

Meadowbrook Country Club may also refer to:

 Meadow Brook Golf Club, Jericho, New York
 Meadowbrook Country Club (Garner, North Carolina)
 Meadowbrook Country Club (Chesterfield County, Virginia)

See also
 Meadow Brook (disambiguation)
 Meadowbrook (disambiguation)